Swedish elections, 2014 can refer to the following elections that occurred in 2014.

 European Parliament election, 2014, to elect the Swedish delegation to the European Parliament
 2014 Swedish general election, to elect the 349 members of the Riksdag
 2014 Swedish county council elections, to elect the 21 county councils
 2014 Swedish municipal elections, to elect the 290 municipal councils